Ahmad Zein (born 1966) is a critically-acclaimed Yemeni writer and journalist, currently living in Riyadh, Saudi Arabia. He works for the Al-Hayat newspaper. He is the author of two novels and two short story collections. The author's work has been published in Banipal magazine. His novel Fruit for the Crows was longlisted for the 2021 Arabic Booker Prize.

Publications 

 Correction (2004)
 American Coffee (2007)
 War Under the Skin (2010) 
 Steamer Point (2015) 

His work has been translated into English, French, and Russian.

References

1968 births
Living people
Yemeni writers
Yemeni novelists
Yemeni journalists
Yemeni expatriates in Saudi Arabia